The Umm Qais Museum (Arabic: متحف أم قيس) is museum in Irbid Governorate, Jordan. The museum is dedicated to exhibiting and conserving artifacts from the archeological site of Umm Qais.

History 
The museum is located in the Acropolis of the ancient Gadara city. The museum is a traditional Arabian house which consists of different diwans and rooms that are surrounded by a central courtyard. The house was built in the 1960s during the Ottoman period. The house was used by the Ottoman ruler Musa Malkawi. The Faleh Falah al-Rousan family owns the house, and so it was named House of Rousan, in honor of this family. The house was renovated in 1990 to become a museum. The museum was used to preserve the antiquities of the archeological site of the city. The rehabilitation of the museum was organized by the General Department of Antiquities and the German Protestant Institute. Ammar Khammash participated in the restoration of the house. In April 2021, the museum was presented with boxes of books on Jordan's heritage. In November 2021, Charles, Prince of Wales visited the museum.

Collections 
The museum has among its exhibits mosaics and coins that were found in excavations. The museum contains artifacts dating from the Hellenistic to the Islamic period, among the artifacts in the museum are masks, among them is Dionysius mask made of pure white marble, also the museum has statues of gods such as Zeus, Sator and Artemis, among the statues is a statue of a snake made of yellowish white limestone, and a statue of Hermes Arbach made of white marble that is on a pedestal. The museum also contains some Egyptian statues made of limestone and basalt. In addition, the museum contains an inscription of the poet Eribuis on a tombstone made of basalt. The museum also exhibits what was found in tombs from the archeological site of the city, as well as pottey collections such as small jars.

Gallery

References 

Museums in Jordan
Buildings and structures in Jordan
1990 establishments in Jordan